Mostyn House School was a school that was originally opened in Tarvin, and moved to Parkgate, Cheshire, in 1855. From 1862 until it closed in 2010, it was run by the Grenfell family, originally as a boys' boarding school, and latterly as a co-educational day school.

Design 
The chapel was designed by Frederick Fraser and Warburton, with input by the headmaster of the school, A. G. Grenfell. It is built in red Ruabon brick with terracotta dressings, and has a red tiled roof with a finial at the east end. The chapel consists of a nave and chancel in a single range, an apsidal east end, and a west bellcote. The furnishings are in collegiate style, designed by Frederick Fraser. In the windows is painted glass made by Morton and Company of Liverpool. The school and its chapel are Grade II listed buildings.

Carillon 
The school's carillon was commissioned in 1918 to commemorate old boys who had died in the war. Upon the closure of the school in 2010 the bells were transported and reinstalled at Charterhouse School in line with the wishes of A.G. Grenfell who wished that if ever Mostyn House ceased to be a school the carillon would be offered to Charterhouse so "that they may go on speaking to English boys as long as England lasts".

Notable alumni 
Sir Wilfred Grenfell (1865–1940), medical missionary to Newfoundland and Labrador, was born in Parkgate and was a pupil at the school. The 6th Duke of Westminster's children attended Mostyn House, including Hugh Grosvenor, 7th Duke of Westminster.

Other notable alumni include:
 George Ward Gunn
 Leonard Monk Isitt
David Partridge
 Gershom Stewart
 James Ward

Gallery

References 

Educational institutions established in 1855
Defunct schools in Cheshire West and Chester
1855 establishments in England
2010 disestablishments in England
Educational institutions disestablished in 2010
Neston
Grade II listed buildings in Cheshire
Grade II listed educational buildings